Los Altos is a Spanish municipality in the province of Burgos, part of the autonomous community of Castile and León.

References 

Municipalities in the Province of Burgos